Mamu Kanjan railway station is located in the town of Mamu Kanjan, Faisalabad district, Pakistan.

Mahala Bagh street Awan wali. Jamia Taleem Ul Islam is a famous mosque of Mamunkanjan.

See also
 List of railway stations in Pakistan
 Pakistan Railways
 Mamu Kanjan

References

External links

Railway stations in Faisalabad District
Railway stations on Shorkot–Sheikhupura line